The United Kingdom's Met Office, in collaboration with its Irish counterpart Met Éireann and, since 2019, its Dutch counterpart the Royal Netherlands Meteorological Institute (KNMI), decided to introduce a storm naming system following the St Jude's day storm on 27–28 October 2013 which caused 17 deaths in Europe and the 2013–14 Atlantic winter storms in Europe to give a single, authoritative naming system to prevent confusion with the media and public using different names for the same storms.

The first windstorm to be named was Abigail on 10 November 2015.

In 2019 the Royal Netherlands Meteorological Institute (KNMI) decided to adopt the same naming system and since then submits a list of suggested names. The definitive list is combined from suggestions from the three countries.

Background
The practice of using names to identify weather systems goes back several centuries, with systems named after places, people or things they hit before the start of the naming scheme. Credit for the first usage of personal names for weather is generally given to the Queensland Government Meteorologist Clement Wragge, who named tropical cyclones and anticyclones between 1887–1907. Wragge used names drawn from the letters of the Greek alphabet, Greek and Roman mythology and female names, to describe weather systems over Australia, New Zealand and the Antarctic. After the new Australian government had failed to create a federal weather bureau and appoint him director, Wragge started naming cyclones after political figures. This system of naming weather systems subsequently fell into disuse for several years after Wragge retired, until it was revived in the latter part of the Second World War. Despite falling into disuse the naming scheme was occasionally mentioned in the press, with an editorial published in the Launceston Examiner newspaper on October 5, 1935 that called for the return of the naming scheme.

Clement Wragge.
WW2.

Tropical cyclone naming

From time to time, tropical cyclones or their remnants impact Europe and retain the name assigned to them by the United States National Hurricane Center.

The Free University of Berlin
The oldest naming system in Europe was developed by Karla Wege, a student at the Free University of Berlin's meteorological institute, who suggested that names should be assigned to all areas of low and high pressure that influenced the weather of Central Europe. The university subsequently started to name every area of high or low pressure within its weather forecasts, from a list of 260 male and 260 female names submitted by its students. The female names were assigned to areas of low pressure while male names were assigned to areas of high pressure. The names were subsequently exclusively used by Berlin's media until February 1990, after which the German media started to commonly use the names, however, they were not officially approved by the German Meteorological Service Deutscher Wetterdienst. The DWD subsequently banned the usage of the names by their offices during July 1991, after complaints had poured in about the naming system. However, the order was leaked to the German press agency, Deutsche Presse-Agentur, who ran it as its lead weather story. Germany's ZDF television channel subsequently ran a phone in poll on 17 July 1991 and claimed that 72% of the 40,000 responses favoured keeping the names. This made the DWD pause and think about the naming system and these days the DWD accept the naming system and request that it is maintained. During 1998 a debate started about if it was discrimination to name areas of high pressure with male names and the areas of low pressure with female names. The issue was subsequently resolved by alternating male and female names each year. In November 2002 the "Adopt-a-Vortex" scheme was started, which allowed members of the public or companies to buy naming rights for a letter chosen by the buyer, that are then assigned alphabetically to high and low pressure areas in Europe during each year. During 2021, the Meteorological Services of Germany, Austria, Switzerland, Poland, Czech Republic, Slovakia and Hungary started to use the names assigned to areas of low pressure by FU Berlin.

EUMETNET
During 2013, in response to the increasing usage by the European media of common names for any meteorological depression that caused disruptive weather, a task force of the Working Group for the Cooperation between European Forecasters (WGCEF) started to work on a naming scheme. The main objective of this project was to develop a project that would be operated by all of the European national meteorological services and used by the media as well as other agencies such as civil protection.

Should a system move from one area to another then it will retain the name it was assigned by the original weather service.

Western Group
During September 2015, the United Kingdom's Met Office and Ireland's Met Éireann announced a 2-year pilot project, to name weather systems that were expected to impact either the UK or Ireland. In order to decide which names were going to be used, members of the public were invited to submit names to the forecasters via social media, which was welcomed with enthusiasm as thousands of names were suggested before they were reviewed by both centres. The first list of names was compiled and issued during October 2015, with any names appearing on the List of retired Atlantic hurricane names or starting with the letters Q, U, X, Y, Z omitted. It was also decided that any post-tropical cyclones that impacted Europe would retain its name and be referred to as "ex-hurricane". Over the next few months, a total of eleven storms were assigned a name whenever a yellow, amber or red warning for wind was issued by either agency. The project also helped Met Éireann communicate the impacts of several systems, which impacted Ireland in quick succession over the 2015-16 Christmas and New Year period. After the season, it was determined that the project was a success, as the names had been adopted and accepted by the public, the media and emergency responders. As a result, it was decided to expand the naming scheme to include other weather types such as rain and snow, if its impact could lead to significant flooding as advised by their partner agencies.

Ahead of the 2019-20 winter, the Royal Netherlands Meteorological Institute (KNMI) decided to join the scheme and name weather systems, in order to raise awareness of dangerous weather before it impacted the country. They decided to name a system if it was forecast to produce significant wind gusts over the country and result in the issuance of an orange or red weather warning.

Southwestern group
Belgium, Luxembourg, France, Spain and Portugal

During 2017, encouraged by the success of the UKMO and Met Éireann naming scheme, the meteorological services of France, Portugal and Spain, decided to set up their own naming scheme. The naming scheme was discussed throughout the year by email, before it was finalised in various web-conferences during the Autumn. It was decided that a system within the Atlantic Ocean or western Mediterranean Sea would be named if it was expected to cause an orange or red wind warning in either France, Spain or Portugal.

Northern group
Denmark, Sweden and Norway

During September 2013, the Danish media used 3 different names that had originated in Britain, Germany and Sweden to describe the St. Jude storm. As a result, this created confusion within Denmark as the public thought that three separate depressions, were impacting the country rather than a single system. During the aftermath of the system, the then minister responsible for the Danish Meteorological Institute Martin Lidegaard, named the system Allan and ordered the DMI to name storms affecting Denmark in the future. During the course of that winter, it became clear that not having a single naming system for significant weather in Europe, was causing confusion as the media used names from different schemes to describe the same storms.

Central Mediterranean group
Italy, Slovenia, Croatia, North Macedonia, Montenegro and Malta

Southeastern Mediterranean group
In January 2017, the National Observatory of Athens (NOA) started to name weather systems, that would be expected to cause significant social and economic consequences in Greece. In order to do this, the NOA developed a number of criteria that took into account, what the meteorological hazard was as well as the size of the affected area and population at risk.

See also

 Winter storm naming in the United States
 Tropical cyclone naming
 Atlantic hurricane season
 European Centre for Medium-Range Weather Forecasts
 European windstorm

References

External links
 Met Office UK Storm Centre
 Met Éireann
 About KNMI

Met Office

Winter weather events in the United Kingdom
Winter weather events in Ireland